The 2017 African Rally Championship was the 37th season of the African Rally Championship (ARC), the FIA regional zone rally championship for the African continent. The season began on February 10, 2017 in the Côte d'Ivoire, and ended on October 22, 2017 in Zambia, after seven events.

The championship was won for the first time by Skoda Fabia driver Manvir Singh Baryan. Baryan won four of the seven rallies in the championship, winning in Uganda, Rwanda, Tanzania and Zambia after the first three rallies of the season were won by drivers not contesting the championship. Baryan won the title by 35 points over Mitsubishi Lancer driver Leeroy Gomes. Gomes' best performance was a second place points finish at the York Rally in South Africa which was dominated by non-point scoring local drivers. Baryan's victory was the first time a Skoda driver has won the ARC and the first new manufacturer to claim the drivers title since Subaru driver Satwant Singh won in 1996.

Event calendar and results
The 2017 African Rally Championship was as follows:

Championship standings
The 2017 African Rally Championship points are as follows:

References

External links

African Rally Championship
African
Rally Championship